Florin Ioan Pelecaci (born 6 January 1980) is a Romanian footballer who currently plays for F.C. Romania. He speaks Romanian, Italian and English.

Career
He played for Romanian clubs FC Baia Mare, CF Gloria 1922 Bistriţa, FK Srem, FC Unirea Urziceni and FC National București before he moved to Hungary.

Diósgyőr
He joined Diósgyőri VTK in January 2008, but he rarely played as he suffered from a number of injuries. Whilst at DVTK he scored one goal, against Vasas on 22 August 2008, a shot from 40 metres.

English football
He subsequently joined Bath City scoring a great goal in FA Cup game, before leaving to join Truro City in January 2010. He scored on his debut for Truro City, in a 3–0 away victory against Cambridge City. In August 2010 he joined Thurrock but he did not play being unhappy with the condition offered.

References

External links
 Clip of a goal with Diósgyőri VTK
 Interview with Sido Jombarti and Florin Pelecaci

1980 births
Living people
Romanian footballers
Romanian expatriate footballers
CS Minaur Baia Mare (football) players
ACF Gloria Bistrița players
FK Srem players
FC Unirea Urziceni players
FC Progresul București players
Diósgyőri VTK players
Bath City F.C. players
Truro City F.C. players
Thurrock F.C. players
Enfield 1893 F.C. players
F.C. Romania players
Serbian First League players
Expatriate footballers in Serbia
Expatriate footballers in Hungary
Expatriate footballers in England
Association football midfielders
Liga I players
Nemzeti Bajnokság I players
Sportspeople from Baia Mare